Lynn is an unincorporated community in Morrill County, Nebraska, United States.

History
A post office was established at Lynn in 1910, and was discontinued in 1923. Lynn was likely named for a pioneer settler.

References

Unincorporated communities in Morrill County, Nebraska
Unincorporated communities in Nebraska